Arabica may refer to:

Food and drink 
 Coffea arabica, the tree species coffee is most often produced from
 Revalenta arabica, an 18th century diet for invalids

Language 
 Arebica, the Bosnian Arabic alphabet
 Belarusian Arabic alphabet

Publications 
 Arabica (journal), a journal of Arabic and Islamic studies